The Defense Health Agency (DHA) is a joint, integrated combat support agency that enables the U.S. Army, U.S. Navy, U.S. Air Force, and U.S. Space Force medical services to provide a medically ready force and ready medical force to Combatant Commands in both peacetime and wartime. The DHA supports the delivery of integrated and affordable health services to MHS beneficiaries and is responsible for integrating clinical and business processes across the MHS.

The DHA’s global workforce of almost 140,000 civilians and military personnel provides medical services to tricare beneficiaries and their dependents.

 Lead Health Care Markets to manage military hospitals and clinics
 Provide Combat Support to Combatant Commands
 Deliver the TRICARE Health Plan to 9.6 million beneficiaries worldwide
 Deploy MHS GENESIS, the new electronic health record, to military hospitals and clinics
 Offer Education and Training to MHS providers to ensure a medically ready force

History
The United States Department of Defense established the DHA as part of a larger effort meant to reorganize its health care programs and services. The reorganization was based in part on the recommendations of a task force that issued a report on the management of U.S. military health care in 2011. Under the old system, many aspects of military health care were managed by the individual armed services (Army, Navy, and Air Force).

Structure

The DHA operates under the authority and oversight of the Assistant Secretary of Defense for Health Affairs. Assistant Secretary Jonathan Woodson, M.D., established the DHA's organizational structure, including six directorates (see organization chart, right).

National Capital Region Medical Directorate
The National Capital Region Medical Directorate is a medical directorate within the DHA.

Education & Training Directorate
Medical Education and Training Campus
''See:

List of directors

See also
 Assistant Secretary of Defense for Health Affairs
 Military Health System
 Military medicine
 Surgeon General of the United States Army
 Surgeon General of the United States Navy
 Surgeon General of the United States Air Force
 TRICARE
 Uniformed Services University of the Health Sciences
 US Family Health Plan

References

External links
 Health.mil, official website of the Military Health System
 Defense Health Program account on USAspending.gov

Military medical organizations of the United States
United States Department of Defense agencies
Government agencies established in 2013
2013 establishments in the United States